Alberada franclemonti is a species of snout moth in the genus Alberada that was described by Herbert H. Neunzig in 1997 and is known from the US state of Arizona.

References

Moths described in 1997
Phycitini
Endemic fauna of Arizona
Moths of North America